Whale|Horse is a rock/post-punk band from Chicago.

Formation 

After their earlier band The Honor System went on hiatus, Tyler Wiseman and Dan Hanaway began work on a new project with assistance from Pines drummer Jason Kyrouac and The Ghost's former bassist, Jordan Schalich. This resulted in some live performances and a few demos in early 2005.

Schalich and Kyrouac left to pursue other interests, but the return of The Honor System bassist Chris Carr and the introduction of ex-Sweep the Leg Johnny drummer Scott Anna kept the project alive.

Count the Electric Sheep 

The new line-up went into the studio and after reworking old demos and recording some new tracks, had a debut release. Count the Electric Sheep, a six-song EP self-produced by Carr at Blackbox Recording, Chicago, was released in late 2006.

Stylistically, Whale|Horse's material bears some resemblance to the later work of the Honor System, but with an emphasis on more enigmatic lyrics, tense songwriting, irregular timings and the further evolution of Dan Hanaway's vocals, more powerful still and now utilising vibrato.

Despite being self-produced, the EP's production is of a high standard.  With it, Whale|Horse have drawn a wide variety of comparisons from Joy Division and Interpol to The Buzzcocks.

Ratasucia
Dan Hanaway and Chris Carr performed together in a new band called Ratasucia, which released their debut album, White Noise Pollution, on Asian Man Records in 2011.

References

 Beatbots review

External links
 Whale|Horse on MySpace (includes option to purchase EP)
 Whale|Horse on Snocap
 Whale|Horse on PureVolume

American post-punk music groups
Musical groups from Chicago